Richard Kimber Franklin (born 15 January 1936) is an English actor, writer, director and political activist. Principally a stage actor, he has also appeared as a regular character in several high-profile British television programmes, including Crossroads and Emmerdale Farm, and he portrayed Captain Mike Yates of UNIT in Doctor Who from 1971 until 1974, returning to the role on a number of occasions both on television and in Doctor Who spin-off media.

Franklin is a dramatist and the author of the book Forest Wisdom: Radical Reform of Democracy and the Welfare State, which reflects his political views and activism, and has written novels based in the Whoniverse. He has stood as a candidate for the UK Parliament for several parties and founded the Silent Majority Party.

Early life and career 
Franklin was educated at Westminster School, and read PPE before going on to complete an MA in Modern History at Christ Church, Oxford. During National Service he was commissioned into the Royal Green Jackets (Rifle Brigade) and was a captain in Queen Victoria's Rifles.  Prior to embarking on an acting career, he spent three years at the advertising agency Hobson and Grey as an assistant account executive, assistant producer and scriptwriter.

Franklin trained as an actor at the Royal Academy of Dramatic Art (colloquially known as RADA), where he won the Jenny Laird prize.

Theatre 
Immediately after graduating from RADA, Franklin spent six years in repertory theatre, beginning at the Century Theatre under the directorship of Heinz Bernard. He then spent two years at Birmingham Rep under Peter Dews, a season at Bristol Old Vic under Val May, before moving to Ipswich where in addition to acting he also held an associate directorship.

Franklin has appeared in a number of productions in London's West End. In 1967 he played the role of Corin in As You Like It at the Vaudeville Theatre, alongside Brian Cox as Orlando. In 1978 he took over the lead role in Same Time, Next Year from Michael Crawford. Most recently he understudied the part of Arthur Kipps in The Woman in Black at the Fortune Theatre, playing the role on a number of occasions. Other theatre acting work includes Macbeth (RSC), The Rocky Horror Show (as the Narrator), The Spider's Web (UK Tour for Ian Dickens), Romeo and Juliet (UK Tour with Sean Maguire), The Importance of Being Earnest (English Speaking Theatre, Frankfurt).

A prolific dramatist, a number of Franklin's plays have been produced professionally. These include:
 The Trial of Johnny Bull (Ipswich Theatre)
 Dr Weird and the Amazing Box (Renaissance Theatre)
 The Cage (Edinburgh) Winner, Spirit of the Fringe award
 Shakespeare was a Hunchback (Edinburgh). The play was later used as the basis for the ITV production The Trial of Richard III
 Poison (London Charterhouse)
  Luck of the Draw (premiered at London Charterhouse in 2014, prior to a small-scale National Tour.)
 Shakespeare by Shaggers (Brighton Fringe)
Franklin has had a long association with the British pantomime tradition, having appeared in eighteen different productions. His most recent pantomime role was the Emperor of China in Aladdin at the New Victoria Theatre, during First Family Entertainment's 2014–15 season. Franklin continues to produce new work, the latest of which is The Luck of the Draw, a drama based on his uncle's private diaries and the experiences of a Tommy in the First World War.

As a director, Franklin held an associate directorship at Ipswich. He directed seasons at Swansea Grand and Chesterfield Civic, and was artistic director of Renaissance Theatre in Stockholm. He has directed at Webber Douglas Academy of Dramatic Art, and Mountview Academy of Theatre Arts, as well as a number of London, Edinburgh and Brighton Fringe productions including his own Luck of the Draw, and Shakespeare by Shaggers.

Television 
Franklin first came to television prominence in 1969 as Joe Townsend in Crossroads, appearing in thirty-six episodes. Over the course of a long television career he has appeared in a number of well-known British programmes including Blake's 7, Dixon of Dock Green, The Saint, Up Your Junction, Going for a Song, The Millicent Martin Show, Little Women, The Pathfinders, Catherine Cookson's The Gambling Man, Heartbeat, and Emmerdale Farm.

Doctor Who 
Franklin first appeared in Doctor Who in the role of Mike Yates, a captain in the fictional military organisation UNIT, in the serial Terror of the Autons (1971), which was the opening story of Jon Pertwee's second season in the role of the Third Doctor. He continued as a series regular until the serial Planet of the Spiders (1974), which also marked the end of Pertwee's tenure as the title character.

He has maintained his association with Doctor Who and appears regularly at conventions, and in spin-off and documentary productions. He has recreated Captain Mike Yates on television twice, for the Twentieth Anniversary special The Five Doctors (1983) and also the Thirtieth Anniversary 3-D Special for Children In Need Dimensions In Time (1993). A photograph of Franklin in role as Yates appeared on screen in the fiftieth anniversary special The Day of the Doctor (2013). He has also appeared in the role on numerous occasions in audio plays for both Big Finish Productions and the BBC, which includes appearing alongside the Fourth Doctor, Tom Baker.

In 2002 Franklin wrote The Killing Stone, a novel featuring Yates as the main character. It was initially released as an audio book, read by the author, before publication by Fantom Films in 2013 under the title Operation H.A.T.E. The rewritten version of the book removed all named references to Doctor Who characters and replaced them with unambiguous equivalents in order to avoid infringing copyright. Franklin also recorded a short cameo, as himself for the live Doctor Who podcast stage show, 50 Years of Doctor Who: Preachrs Podcast Live 2. He appeared in this alongside a mix of modern and classic Doctor Who actors, including Nicholas Briggs, Peter Davison, Simon Fisher Becker and Terry Molloy.

Film 
Franklin has collaborated with the director Julian Doyle on two films: Chemical Wedding (2008), about the occultist Aleister Crowley, and Twilight of the Gods (2013), in which he portrayed the German composer Richard Wagner. In 2016, he played Sirro Argonne, one of the Death Star engineers in the Star Wars film Rogue One.

Audio drama 
In addition to his numerous appearances in Doctor Who audio dramas, including the audiobook Last of the Gaderene by Mark Gatiss, Franklin's audio credits include two years at BBC radio drama; Sapphire and Steel: The Surest Poison (Big Finish); Harrison Howell in the BBC Radio 2 production of Kiss Me Kate (1996); USA Family Radio; and his own World War I docudrama Luck of the Draw. He also played Davros' father, Nasgard, in the Big Finish audio drama miniseries I, Davros.

Music videos 
In 2009 Franklin starred in "The First Days of Spring" for the band Noah and the Whale.

Journalism 
Franklin has worked as a theatre critic, and has published a number of reviews for the Edinburgh Evening News and fringereview.co.uk.

Political activities 
Franklin's political activities include:
 Candidate in the 1992 United Kingdom general election in Sheffield Brightside for the Liberal Democrats, receiving 5,273 votes
 Candidate in the 1997 United Kingdom general election in Hackney South and Shoreditch for the Referendum Party, receiving 613 votes
 Candidate in the 2001 United Kingdom general election in Hove for the United Kingdom Independence Party, receiving 358 votes
 Founded the Silent Majority Party
 Candidate in the 2005 United Kingdom general election in Hove for the Silent Majority Party, receiving 78 votes
 Founded the 30-50 coalition. The group fielded Elliot Ball as a candidate in the 2015 United Kingdom general election in Bethnal Green and Bow. Ball received 78 votes.

Franklin's political work has led to television appearances on Campaign Calendar (Yorkshire TV). In 1993 he made a speech to the Liberal Democrat Conference which was broadcast by Sky TV.

Filmography

Film

Television

References

External links 
 Official Website of Richard Franklin

 
Richard Franklin Interview at Best British TV

1936 births
Military personnel from London
Royal Green Jackets officers
Queen Victoria's Rifles officers
20th-century British Army personnel
Alumni of RADA
English male stage actors
English male television actors
Liberal Democrats (UK) parliamentary candidates
Living people
People from Marylebone
Referendum Party politicians
UK Independence Party parliamentary candidates